De Saint-Gelais can refer to:

Anne-Armande de Crequy
Mellin de Saint-Gelais
Octavien de Saint-Gelais

See also
Saint-Gelais